The Reading Post (until 2009, the Reading Evening Post) was an English local newspaper covering Reading, Berkshire and surrounding areas. The title page of the paper featured the Maiwand Lion, a famous local landmark at Forbury Gardens. The paper was most recently published by Surrey & Berkshire Media Ltd., a division of Trinity Mirror plc.

Editions
In 2009, the paper changed from daily publication to publishing weekly on a Wednesday as a paid-for paper with a free edition on a Friday titled Get Reading. The paper was previously promoted as an evening paper and published Monday to Friday. In recent years, all editions were tabloid though it was launched as a broadsheet.

Sale
In February 2010 the division of Guardian Media Group that included the Reading Evening Post was sold to Trinity Mirror. This sale included 22 titles across the north of England and in Surrey and Berkshire.

Awards
The Reading Evening Post was named Regional Newspaper of the Year for the second year running at the 2004 Newspaper Awards.

Closure
The final issue was published on 17 December 2014.

References

External links
 

Year of establishment missing
Newspapers published in Berkshire
Reach plc